Cristian Carletti (born 27 July 1996) is an Italian footballer who plays as a forward for  club Trento.

Career
Carletti begun his career with Ariete in the Terza categoria - the Italian ninth (and last) division - where he was top scorer with 27 goals in 18 games, and within ten months transferred to both Pergolettese in the Serie D, and then to Carpi in the Serie B.
Carletti made his professional debut in a 0–0 draw against Perugia on 26 March 2017.

On 7 January 2021, he was loaned to Arezzo with an option to purchase.

On 19 August 2021, he signed a two-year contract with Latina.

On 5 January 2023, Carletti moved to Trento on a 1.5-year contract.

References

External links

Carletti Sky Profile

1996 births
Living people
Sportspeople from Cremona
Footballers from Lombardy
Italian footballers
Association football forwards
Serie B players
Serie C players
Serie D players
U.S. Pergolettese 1932 players
A.C. Carpi players
A.C. Prato players
A.C. Gozzano players
S.S. Arezzo players
Latina Calcio 1932 players
A.C. Trento 1921 players